Camarines Sur, officially the Province of Camarines Sur (Bikol: Probinsya kan Habagatan na Camarines (Camarines Sur)), is a province in the Philippines located in the Bicol Region on Luzon. Its capital is Pili and the province borders Camarines Norte and Quezon to the northwest, and Albay to the south. To the east lies the island province of Catanduanes across the Maqueda Channel.

Camarines Sur is the largest among the six provinces in the Bicol Region both by population and land area. Its territory includes two cities: Naga, the lone chartered city, as the province's religious, cultural, financial, commercial, industrial and business center; and Iriga, a component city, as the center of the Rinconada area and Riŋkonāda Language. Within the province lies Lake Buhi, where the smallest commercially harvested fish, the Sinarapan (Mistichthys luzonensis), can be found. The province is also home to the critically endangered Isarog Agta language, one of the three critically endangered languages in the Philippines according to UNESCO.

History

Pre-colonial and Spanish colonial era
The earliest settlers in Camarines Sur are the Isarog Agta people who live within the circumference of Mount Isarog and the Iraya Agta who live within the circumference of Mount Iraya. They have been in the province for thousands of years and have been one of the first settlers in the entire Philippines.

In July 1569, Luis Enríquez de Guzmán, a member of the expedition led by Maestro de Campo Mateo de Saz and Captain Martín de Goiti, led a group which crossed from Burias and Ticao islands and landed on a coastal settlement called Ibalon in what is now the province of Sorsogon. From this point another expedition was sent to explore the interior and founded the town of Camalig.

In 1573, Spanish conquistador Juan de Salcedo penetrated the Bicol Peninsula from the north as made it as far south as Libon, establishing the settlement of Santiago de Libon. José María de Peñaranda, the first governor of Albay and a military engineer, was made corregidor of the province on 14 May 1834. He constructed public buildings and built roads and bridges. The entire Bicol Peninsula was organized as one province with two divisions, Camarines in the northwest and Ibalon in the southeast. In 1636, the two were separated.

Known centuries ago as the Tierra de Camarines, the province is distinctly Spanish-founded settlement. Its name having been derived from camaronchones or camarines, a Spanish word for kamalig referring to small nipa or bamboo-made huts by the natives.

In 1574, Governor General Guido de Lavezaris referred Camarines Sur to the King of Spain as Los Camarines, after the abundance of camarins-rice granaries – which were conspicuous features of the area.

Spanish colonizers later subjugated its people and denominated the area into two distinct aggrupations. 
Partido de Camarines was partitioned into Camarines Sur and Camarines Norte in 1829, and thereafter underwent fusion, annexations and re-partitions until 19 March 1919, when two provinces, jointly called Ambos Camarines, were finally separated with their present boundaries by decree of the First Philippine Legislature.

The Philippine Revolution started in Ambos Camarines when Elías Ángeles and Félix Plazo, Filipino corporals in the Spanish Army, sided with revolutionists and fought the local Spanish forces on 17 September 1898. Governor Vicente Zaidín capitulated to the revolutionists on the following day. With the arrival of General Vicente Lukbán, the revolutionary government in the Bicol Region was established.

American colonial era and World War II
The American forces occupied the Bicol Peninsula in January 1900. In March of the same year. General John M. Bell was made the military governor of the southeastern Luzon. Civil government was finally established in Ambos Camarines in April 1901.

During World War II, Camarines Sur came under Japanese occupation in late December 1941, following the capture of Naga City on 18 December, a few days after the Japanese invasion of Legaspi. Guerrilla units were organized by Wenceslao Q. Vinzons that waged underground operations against the Japanese troops stationed in Camarines Sur. After the capture of Vinzons on 8 July 1942, the guerrilla movement was carried on by Lieutenant Francisco Boayes and by the Tangcong Vaca Guerrilla Unit organized by Elías Madrid, Juan Miranda and León Aureus. In April 1945, Camarines Sur was finally liberated from the Japanese invaders against the combined Filipino and American troops in 1945.

On 8 March 1942, the famous Tangcong Vaca Guerrilla Unit (TVGU) was organized in San Nicolás, Canaman, with Juan Miranda as the Commanding Officer, León Aureus as the Executive Officer and Elìas Madrid as the Finance Officer. Among the numerous Canamanons who joined-up soon afterwards either in the unit's intelligence or combat components were José and Antonio Madrid, Mamerto Sibulo, Andrés Fortaleza, Marcos Severo, Dámaso Avenilla, Federico Crescini, Nicolás Vargas, Venancio Begino, Eugenio Ragodón, Juan Pachica, Santiago Amaro, José Gervás, Pedro Ángeles, Aproniano López, Andrés Alzate, Modesto Sánchez, Blas Alcántara, Andrés Aguilar, Florencio Frondozo, Alfredo de la Torre, and Flaviano Estrada.

The military general headquarters and military camp bases of the Philippine Commonwealth Army were active from 3 January 1942 until 30 June 1946, and the Philippine Constabulary was active from 28 October 1944 to 30 June 1946, in the province of Camarines Sur. The Filipino soldiers of the Philippine Commonwealth Army and Philippine Constabulary were spearheading the local military special operations in Bicol Region with the Bicolano guerrilla units decisively aiding them.

In 1945, Filipino and American troops along with the Bicolano guerrillas, liberated Camarines Sur from the Japanese forces towards the end of WWII. Local Filipino troops of the 4th, 5th, 52nd, 53rd, 55th, 56th and 57th Infantry Division of the Philippine Commonwealth Army and the 5th Constabulary Regiment of the Philippine Constabulary were involved in the liberation efforts.

Transfer of provincial capital
Naga, the former capital of Camarines Sur, was founded in 1573 as Nueva Cáceres, named after the city in Spain. It was among the original five royal cities of the colony. It was designated as the provincial capital by virtue of Philippine Legislative Act No. 2711 approved on 10 March 1917. On 6 June 1955, however, Pili, the adjoining town, was declared the provincial capital by virtue of Republic Act 1336. Pili functions as the provincial capital up to the present.

Geography

Camarines Sur covers a total area of  occupying the central section of the Bicol Region in Luzon. The province borders Camarines Norte and Quezon to the northwest, and Albay to the south. To the east lies the Maqueda Channel. Camarines Sur is home to five (5) out of eleven (11) declared natural parks in Bicol Region (Region V), namely Bicol Natural Park between the borders of Camarines Sur and Camarines Norte, Buhi Wildlife Sanctuary, Lagonoy Natural Biotic Area, Malabungot Protected Landscape in Caramoan, Camarines Sur, and Mount Isarog Natural Park, totaling 17,769.23 hectares.

Terrain

Camarines Sur occupies the central section of the Bicol Peninsula. At the center of the province is the Bicol Plain, surrounded by mountains which include Mount Bernacci (Tangcong Vaca), Mount Isarog and Mount Iriga. The eastern portion of the province lies on the mountainous Caramoan Peninsula, which faces the island of Catanduanes to the east.

The Bicol River drains the central and southern parts of the province into the San Miguel Bay. Mount Asog is surrounded by three lakes: Buhi, Bato, and Baao.

Climate
The climate in Camarines Sur, like most of the rest of the country, is very tropical.

Administrative divisions

Camarines Sur comprises into 2 cities and 35 municipalities.

Demographics

During the May 2010 census, there were 1,822,371 residents in Camarines Sur, making it the most populous in the region. The census also stated that Camarines Sur had 288,172 households with an average household size of 5.37 persons, significantly higher than the national average of 4.99. The annual growth rate was 1.86%, much lower than the national growth rate of 2.36%. This rate of growth will double the population of Camarines Sur in 8 years.

Religion
The religion of the province is predominantly Roman Catholicism followed by 93% of the population. Other religions professed by the people include the Iglesia Filipina Independiente or Aglipayan Church, Iglesia Ni Cristo (INC), Baptist, The Church of Jesus Christ of Latter-day Saints (Mormons), Jehovah's Witnesses, Methodists and other smaller Christian groups. Islam is also present in the province with their mosques stood in large population areas. Sikhism and Taoism is present in the province as well. Some do not practice religion or identify as Agnostic.

Prior to colonization, the region had a complex religious system which involved various deities. Among these deities include: 
Gugurang, the supreme god who dwells inside of Mount Mayon where he guards and protects the sacred fire in which Asuang, his brother was trying to steal. Whenever people disobey his orders or commit numerous sins, he would cause Mount Mayon to burst lava as a sign of warning for people to mend their crooked ways. Ancient Bikolanos had a rite performed for him called Atang.
Asuang, the evil god who always tries to steal the sacred fire of Mount Mayón from his brother, Gugurang. Addressed sometimes as Aswang, he dwells mainly inside Mount Malinao. As an evil god, he would cause the people to suffer misfortunes and commit sins. Enemy of Gugurang and a friend of Bulan, the god of the moon.
Haliya, the masked goddess of the moonlight and protector of Bulan and the arch-enemy of Bakunawa. Her cult is composed primarily of women. There is also a ritual dance named after her as it is performed to be a counter-measure against Bakunawa.
Bulan, the god of the pale moon, he is depicted as a pubescent boy with uncommon comeliness that made savage beast and the vicious mermaids (Magindara) tame. He has deep affection towards the sea god Magindang, but plays with him by running away so that Magindang would never catch him. The reason for this is because he is shy to the man that he loves. If Magindang manages to catch Bulan, Haliya always comes to free him from Magindang's grip.
Magindang, the god of the sea and all its creatures. He has deep affection to the lunar god Bulan and pursues him despite never catching him. Due to this, the Bicolanos reasoned that it is to why the waves rise to reach the moon when seen from the distant horizon. Whenever he does catch up to Bulan, Haliya comes to rescue Bulan and free him immediately.
Bakunawa, a gigantic sea serpent deity who is often considered as the cause of eclipses, the devourer of the sun and the moon, and an adversary of Haliya as Bakunawa's main aim is to swallow Bulan, who Haliya swore to protect for all of eternity.
Okot, god of forest and hunting.

Languages
The main languages spoken in Camarines Sur are the Coastal Bikol (especially Central Bikol) and Inland Bikol group of languages. The latter is a group of languages that includes Albay Bikol group and Rinconada Bikol, while the former just consists dialects.

Coastal Bikol (Central Bikol) 
A dialect of Coastal Bikol, called Coastal Bikol-Partido is used in the eastern portion of the province around Lagonoy Gulf, and another dialect called Coastal Bikol-Central is spoken around Naga City.

The Canaman dialect of Central Bikol variant of Coastal Bikol spoken in Canaman, Camarines Sur is said to be the "purest" form of Bikol (according to Jesuit anthropologist Frank Lynch, S.J.), though most linguists just consider it as the standard form of Central Bikol language since other Coastal Bikol languages, Rinconada Bikol and Buhinon (both Inland Bikol) are separate languages.

Rinconada Bikol 
The Rinconada Bikol also known as Riŋkonāda (under the umbrella of Inland Bikol group of languages), is used by most people in the Rinconada area or district of the province especially in Nabua, Iriga City and by people of Rinconada in diaspora. Buhinon (one of the languages of Albay Bikol group, another member of Inland Bikol), is a minority language spoken in the town of Buhi and around Lake Buhi. Most inhabitants of Camarines Sur understand Tagalog and English.

Isarog Agta
In 2010, UNESCO released its 3rd world volume of Endangered Languages in the World, where 3 critically endangered languages were in the Philippines. One of these languages in the Isarog Agta language which has an estimated 5 speakers in the year 2000. The language was classified as Critically Endangered, meaning the youngest speakers are grandparents and older, and they speak the language partially and infrequently and hardly pass the language to their children and grandchildren anymore. If the remaining 150 people do not pass their native language to the next generation of Isarog Agta people, their indigenous language will be extinct within a period of 1 to 2 decades.

The Isarog Agta people live within the circumference of Mount Isarog, though only 5 of them still know their indigenous language. They are one of the original Negrito settlers in the entire Philippines. They belong to the Aeta people classification, but have distinct language and belief systems unique to their own culture and heritage.

Urban History 

Camarines Sur strated having urban areas since the Spanish Colonial Period with Naga City (or Nueva Caceres) becoming urban in the 19th century due to it being the center of commerce in the former province of Ambos Camarines. Nabua (Which formerly included present day Balatan), Libmanan (Then included present day Cabusao and some barangays of Canaman Pamplona and Pasacao), Sipocot, Pili, Calabanga, Iriga then followed Nueva Caceres with some barangays being classified as urban.

By the late 1990s the remaining rural municipalities were Siruma, Garchitorena, Presentacion and Cabusao. Until 2007 when all of these 4 municipalities were classified as urban by the National Statistics Office.

Economy

The economy of Camarines Sur is mostly agriculture-based. 29 of the 35 towns are agricultural and produce rice, corn, feedmeal, freshwater fish, livestock, coconut, sugar, abacá, and water-lily.

Entrepreneurs engage in trading, often branching out towards neighboring provinces in the south as local demand might be limited by the 3rd to 5th income-class municipalities. Handicrafts are the major source of rural income, providing a fairly large share in the small-scale industries of the province. Forestry and papermaking are other sources of livelihood. The manufacture of abacá products such as Manila hemp, hats, bags, mats, and slippers is one of the main sources of income in the rural areas. Fishing is also done along both shores of the province. Tourism, primarily because of Caramoan and Mount Isarog, also generates income for Camarines Sur.

Naga and several towns have a tri-economy or three-base economy: commerce, industry, and agriculture.  As the main center in the Bicol Region, all of the products from other provinces in the region are brought to Naga. It has four major industries: the manufacture of jewelry and gifts/toys/housewares, and processing of pineapple and coconut. Naga also has vast cornfields, rice fields, and water lily farms all over the city.

Calabanga, Cabusao, Libmanan and Sipocot have similar economies to Naga City. Calabanga has commerce from goods moving out of Naga, and is the trade center for the towns of Tinambac, Goa, and Siruma. Calabanga also has fishing from the Quipayo Fishing Center (the largest in Bicol), and vast productions of corn, sugar, and rice, which benefit from a large granary. Libmanan has 156 hectares of ricefields and cornfields, and fishing along its coastline connecting the towns of Ragay and Pasacao; Libmanan also has a commercial district. Sipocot has an agricultural base economy, with an abundant stock of native chicken (Sipocot's OTOP) and wide production of calamansi and other vegetables, while also serving as trading post for towns of Cabusao, Lupi, Del Gallego, Libmanan Ragay and Mercedes (Camarines Norte) Tagkawayan (Quezon Province) . Fish products from these towns are received by Sipocot. Other towns not mentioned have a fishing industry as the main base of their economy.

Naga City, Iriga city, and Pili are the main economic centers of Camarines Sur.

The towns of Nabua, Goa, Calabanga, Libmanan, Pasacao, Sipocot, Baao are also taking successful steps towards urbanization and competitiveness.

Milaor, Camaligan, Canaman, Magarao, Gainza serves as a sub-urban area of Naga City.

The rest of the province takes a long time to urbanize due to lack of major roads, or isolation from business centers.

Tourist attractions
 19th-century churches – There are a number of century-old churches in Goa, San Jose, and Sagñay.
 Our Lady of Peñafrancia Church – Completed in 1750, this two-century-old church is a site of pilgrimage located in Naga.
 Lake Buhi – Created by volcanic activity, this isolated lake is famous for unique organisms including the world's smallest commercially harvested fish.
 Mount Isarog and Mount Asog – Two potentially active volcanoes with hiking trails to explore rich biodiversity.
 Beaches of Sagñay, Sabang (Partido) and Caramoan – These black and white sand beaches are shielded by coral reefs.
 Pasacao – Known for its beaches as "the Summer Capital of Cam. Sur".

Infrastructure

Road Transportation 

The Pan-Philippine Highway (N1/AH26), is the highway backbone network, and the secondary and tertiary roads interconnect most cities and municipalities in Sipocot, Libmanan, Pamplona, San Fernando, Milaor, Naga City, Pili, Bula, Baao, Nabua before ending at Bato.

In order to spur development in the province, There will be two expressways in Camarines Sur that will be proposed:
 The Toll Regulatory Board declared Toll Road 5 the extension of South Luzon Expressway. A 420-kilometer, four lane expressway starting from the terminal point of the now under construction SLEX Toll Road 4 at Barangay Mayao, Lucena City in Quezon to Matnog, Sorsogon, near the Matnog Ferry Terminal. On August 25, 2020, San Miguel Corporation announced that they will invest the project which will reduce travel time from Lucena to Matnog from 9 hours to 5.5 hours.
 The other expressway to serve Camarines Sur is the Quezon-Bicol Expressway which will link between Lucena and San Fernando, Camarines Sur.

See also
 List of Bicol Region Cities and Municipalities

References

External links

 
 
 
 Official Website of the Provincial Government of Camarines Sur

 
Provinces of the Philippines
Provinces of the Bicol Region
States and territories established in 1829
1829 establishments in the Philippines